Nyle DiMarco (born May 8, 1989) is an American model, actor, and deaf activist. In 2015, DiMarco was the winner of The CW's reality television series America's Next Top Model in season 22, becoming the second male winner and the first deaf winner. In the following year, he and professional dance partner Peta Murgatroyd were the winners of the ABC televised dance competition Dancing with the Stars in season 22.

Early life 
DiMarco was born in Queens, New York as Nyle Thompson, explaining in 2016 that at some unspecified point, "We changed our last name from Thompson to DiMarco (our mother's maiden name)." He is of English, Scottish, Italian and German descent. DiMarco grew up in Frederick, Maryland, where he attended the Maryland School for the Deaf, and went on to graduate from Gallaudet University in 2013, with a degree in mathematics. American Sign Language (ASL) is his native language but he uses English fluently in writing. Nyle also gets by with lip reading and nonverbal communication. He has a fraternal twin brother, Nico, and an older brother, Neal.

Career 

In 2013, DiMarco had a leading role in the independent film In the Can, an American Sign Language Films production. In 2014 and 2015, he played the recurring role of Garrett Banducci in Switched at Birth on the Freeform network.

DiMarco was doing freelance modeling for about a year before he was contacted by America's Next Top Model producers in 2015. They scouted him via his social media without realizing he was deaf. He was named the winner of the season after beating out Mamé Adjei in the season finale. He is the only deaf male in the show's history, the first deaf winner, and the second male to win.

Shortly after winning the competition, DiMarco signed with Wilhelmina Models in New York City.

On March 8, 2016, DiMarco was announced as one of the celebrities who would compete on season 22 of Dancing with the Stars. He was partnered with professional dancer Peta Murgatroyd. DiMarco is the second deaf contestant to compete on the show after Marlee Matlin. On May 24, 2016, DiMarco and Murgatroyd were announced as the winners of the season. DiMarco became the first deaf celebrity to win any global version of BBC Worldwide's Dancing with the Stars franchise. 

In 2016, DiMarco appeared in the Hulu comedy series Difficult People. Later on, he appeared on Tóc Tiên's music video for "Big Girls Don't Cry" in January and Alex Newell's music video for "Basically Over You (BOY)" in March.

In June 2016, DiMarco walked for Giorgio Armani at Milan Fashion Week Spring/Summer 2017.

DiMarco was featured on DIVERSEability Magazine's 2017 Summer issue. He was also honored as DEAF LIFE Magazine's "Deaf Person of the Year" (January 2017 issue).

DiMarco played the lead role in Dan + Shay's "Tequila" music video, which premiered in February 2018.

Dancing with the Stars performances

Dimarco was partnered with professional ballroom dancer Peta Murgatroyd on the 22nd season of the ABC televised dance competition Dancing with the Stars.

Dimarco was the show's second deaf contestant, the first being Marlee Matlin in 2008.

1 Score by guest judge Zendaya.

2 This week only, for "Partner Switch-Up" week, DiMarco performed with Sharna Burgess instead of Murgatroyd. Murgatroyd performed with Doug Flutie.

3 Score by guest judge Maksim Chmerkovskiy.

4 Due to Tonioli being the judge coaching DiMarco's team during the team-up dance, the viewers scored the dance in his place with the averaged score being counted alongside the remaining judges.

Personal life and activism 

In October 2015, DiMarco came out as "sexually fluid" when asked during an interview with Out magazine about his sexuality.

DiMarco does not consider himself disabled by deafness and sees his media profile as an opportunity to bring awareness to Deaf culture. He views deafness as an advantage in modeling because he is accustomed to communicating without speaking. He believes deaf actors should play deaf roles.

DiMarco is a spokesperson for LEAD-K (Language Equality and Acquisition for Deaf Kids). He is also a signer and creative collaborator on The ASL App, an app that teaches ASL.

In 2016, DiMarco started The Nyle DiMarco Foundation, a non-profit organization providing access to resources for deaf children and their families.

DiMarco supported Hillary Clinton's presidential campaign during the 2016 U.S. election. He criticized Republican nominee Donald Trump, after reports surfaced of ableist comments, one directed at deaf actress Marlee Matlin. DiMarco stated, "[T]here are 55 million disabled people living in America. I don't want a president who marginalizes my community."

On November 22, 2020, DiMarco delivered the keynote address at the closing general session of the Annual Convention and Expo of the American Council on the Teaching of Foreign Languages. In the keynote address, DiMarco drew comparisons between his experiences in education (both in Deaf schools and in hearing schools) and the experiences of learners of world languages negotiating cultural differences. Due to the COVID-19 pandemic, the conference was fully online, so DiMarco delivered the keynote via video streaming.

Filmography

Television

Music video appearances

Accolades

References

External links 

 
 

1989 births
Male models from New York (state)
America's Next Top Model winners
Dancing with the Stars (American TV series) winners
American deaf people
American male deaf actors
Living people
American LGBT actors
LGBT models
Models with disabilities
Gallaudet University alumni
People from Queens, New York
People from Frederick, Maryland
Male actors from New York (state)
Male actors from Maryland
Male models from Maryland
LGBT people from New York (state)
LGBT people from Maryland
LGBT male actors
Sexually fluid men
21st-century LGBT people